The following article is a summary of the 2016 football season in Kenya, which was the 52nd competitive season in its history.

Football Kenya Federation elections
On 10 February, the Football Kenya Federation held elections for a new president, vice-president and new members of the federation's National Executive Committee (NEC). Prior to the elections, three of the five candidates pulled out of the presidential race, while incumbent president Sam Nyamweya announced his withdrawal during a speech made before voting began.

A total of 77 delegates took part in the voting process, which took place at the Moi International Sports Centre in Kasarani, Nairobi.

President

Vice-president

National Executive Committee

Central

Coast

Eastern

Nairobi

North-Eastern

Nyanza

Rift Valley

Western

Domestic leagues

Promotion and relegation

Promoted to Premier League
 Kakamega Homeboyz
 Posta Rangers

Relegated from Premier League
 Kenya Commercial Bank
 Nakuru AllStars

Premier League

The 2016 Kenyan Premier League season began on 13 February and ended on 29 October.

National Super League
The 2016 Kenyan National Super League season began on 19 March and ended on 10 December.

Domestic cups

Super Cup

The 2016 Kenyan Super Cup match was played on 6 February between Gor Mahia, the 2015 Kenyan Premier League champions, and Bandari, the 2015 FKF President's Cup champions. Bandari won the match 1–0 after 90 minutes.

Top 8 Cup

The 2016 KPL Top 8 Cup began on 1 May and ended on 16 October.

International club competitions

Champions League

The 2016 CAF Champions League began on 12 February and ended on 23 October. Gor Mahia represented Kenya in the competition, having won the 2015 Kenyan Premier League.

Preliminary round
In the preliminary round, Gor Mahia faced 2015 THB Champions League winners CNaPS Sport over two legs, played on 13 and 27 February. They were eliminated after losing 3–1 on aggregate.

Confederation Cup

The 2016 CAF Confederation Cup began on 12 February and ended on 6 November. Bandari represented Kenya in the competition, having won the 2015 FKF President's Cup.

Preliminary round
In the preliminary round, Bandari faced 2015 Coupe du Congo champions FC Saint-Éloi Lupopo over two legs, played on 14 and 28 February. They were eliminated after losing 3–1 on aggregate.

National teams

Men's senior

Africa Cup of Nations qualification

The men's senior national team participated in qualification for the 2017 Africa Cup of Nations. They were drawn in Group E alongside Zambia, Congo and Guinea-Bissau.

Other matches
The following is a list of all other matches played by the men's senior national team in 2016.

Women's senior

Africa Women Cup of Nations
The women's senior national team participated in the 2016 Africa Women Cup of Nations, which took place in Cameroon from 19 November to 3 December. The team made an appearance in the tournament for the first time in their history.

Qualification

First round
In the first round, Kenya was to face DR Congo over two legs, to be played on 4–6 March and 18–20 March. However, Kenya received a walkover and advanced to the second round after DR Congo withdrew from the competition.

Second round
In the second round, Kenya faced Algeria over two legs, played on 8 and 12 April. They qualified for the final tournament after drawing 3–3 on aggregate, but winning through the away goals rule.

3–3 on aggregate. Kenya qualify for final tournament on away goals.

Group stage
The draw for the 2016 Africa Women Cup of Nations took place on 18 September 2016 in Yaoundé, Cameroon. Kenya were drawn in Group B alongside Nigeria, Mali and Ghana, but exited the tournament after finishing fourth with no points from their 3 matches.

Men's under-20

Africa U-20 Cup of Nations qualification
The men's national under-20 team participated in qualification for the 2017 Africa U-20 Cup of Nations.

First round
In the first round, Kenya was facing Sudan over two legs, to be played on 3 and 23 April. However, on 20 April, the Confederation of African Football (CAF) announced Kenya's disqualification for fielding five players born before January 1997 in the first leg.

Kenya disqualified from competition. Sudan advance to second round.

Boys' under-17

Africa U-17 Cup of Nations qualification
The boys' national under-17 team participated in qualification for the 2017 Africa U-17 Cup of Nations.

First round
In the first round, Kenya was to face Malawi over two legs, to be played on 24 June and 1 July. However, the Football Association of Malawi announced that their team withdrew from the competition, allowing Kenya to progress to the second round by default.

Second round
In the second round, Kenya faced Cameroon over two legs, played on 5 and 20 August. They were eliminated after losing 9–1 on aggregate.

COSAFA Under-17 Championship
Kenya was invited to participate in the 5th edition of the COSAFA Cup, which is being hosted by Mauritius and ran from 22 to 31 July. They finished fourth in the competition after losing 2–0 to Malawi in the third place playoff.

References